Ruthenoceras is a conical Cambrian fossil originally classified as a cephalopod, but which is too poorly preserved for a classification to be upheld.

References

Cambrian invertebrates
Enigmatic prehistoric animal genera
Cambrian animals of North America